The Prêmio Extra de Televisão de melhor atriz (English: Extra Television Awards for Best Actress) is a category of the Prêmio Extra de Televisão, destined to the best actress of the Brazilian television.

Winner

1998–2007 
1998 – Susana Vieira in Por Amor
1999 – Letícia Spiller in Suave Veneno
2000 – Giovanna Antonelli in Laços de Família 
2001 – Zezé Polessa in Porto dos Milagres
2002 – Débora Falabella in O Clone
2003 – Giulia Gam in Mulheres Apaixonadas
2004 – Susana Vieira in Senhora do Destino 
2005 – Eliane Giardini in América 
2006 – Lília Cabral in Páginas da Vida
2007 – Camila Pitanga in Paraíso Tropical

2008–present
2008 – Patrícia Pillar in A Favorita
Aline Moraes in Duas Caras  
Ana Paula Arósio in Ciranda de Pedra 
Cláudia Raia in A Favorita
Renata Dominguez in Amor e Intrigas
2009 – Letícia Sabatella in Caminho das Índias
Flávia Alessandra in Caras & Bocas
Grazi Massafera in Negócio da China
Juliana Paes in Caminho das Índias
Nathalia Dill in Paraíso
Paloma Duarte in Poder Paralelo
2010 – Nathalia Dill in Escrito nas Estrelas
Adriana Esteves in Dalva e Herivelto: uma Canção de Amor
Alinne Moraes in Viver a Vida
Claudia Raia in Ti Ti Ti
Mariana Ximenes in Passione
Paolla Oliveira in Cama de Gato
2011 – Andréa Beltrão in Tapas & Beijos
Alinne Moraes in O Astro
Carolina Ferraz in O Astro
Cleo Pires in Araguaia
Glória Pires in Insensato Coração
Cássia Kis Magro in Morde & Assopra
2012 – Adriana Esteves in Avenida Brasil
Cláudia Abreu in Cheias de Charme
Christiane Torloni in Fina Estampa
Debora Falabella in Avenida Brasil
Marjorie Estiano in A Vida da Gente
Taís Araújo in Cheias de Charme
2013 – Giovanna Antonelli in Salve Jorge
Giulia Gam in Sangue Bom
Nanda Costa in Salve Jorge
Paolla Oliveira in Amor à Vida
Sophie Charlotte in Sangue Bom
Susana Vieira in Amor à Vida
2014 – Lília Cabral in Império
Bruna Marquezine in Em Família
Drica Moraes in Império
Isis Valverde in Boogie Oogie
Julia Lemmertz in Em Família
Juliana Paes in Meu Pedacinho de Chão
2015 – Marieta Severo in Verdades Secretas
Glória Pires in Babilônia
Irene Ravache in Além do Tempo
Paolla Oliveira in Felizes para Sempre?
Vanessa Giácomo in A Regra do Jogo
2016 – Adriana Esteves in Justiça
Andreia Horta in Liberdade, Liberdade
Camila Pitanga in Velho Chico
Débora Bloch in Justiça
Marina Ruy Barbosa in Totalmente Demais
Tatá Werneck in Haja Coração

References

External links 
Official website

Television awards for Best Actress
Prêmio Extra de Televisão
1998 establishments in Brazil